Centrum is a station on Line M1 of the Warsaw Metro, located under Plac Defilad, a square in the borough of Śródmieście, next to the Dmowski roundabout, where the two main streets, Marszałkowska and Aleje Jerozolimskie, intersect. It is located close to the Palace of Culture and Science and connections can be made, via Pasaż Wisławy Szymborskiej and Aleje Jerozolimskie at ground level, to Warszawa Śródmieście railway station which is in turn directly connected to Warszawa Centralna railway station. It has two levels: the lower one contains the platforms and the upper one is a shopping mall.

The station was opened on 26 May 1998 as the northern terminus of the extension from Politechnika. On 11 May 2001, the line was extended north to Ratusz.

See also 
Plac Konstytucji: a planned station south of Centrum

References

External links

Railway stations in Poland opened in 1998
Line 1 (Warsaw Metro) stations
Śródmieście, Warsaw